Sunnyside is an unincorporated community in Bay County, Florida, United States. It is part of the Panama City–Lynn Haven–Panama City Beach Metropolitan Statistical Area.

Sunnyside is located along State Road 30 (former US 98 Alternate) west of Laguna Beach and Santa Monica, and east of Riviera Beach.

References

Unincorporated communities in Bay County, Florida
Unincorporated communities in Florida
Populated coastal places in Florida on the Gulf of Mexico